"Only Love" is the second single by The Braxtons taken from their debut album So Many Ways. The song was written by Andrea Martin and produced by Allen "Allstar" Gordon. 

The song charted at #52 on Billboard's Hot R&B/Hip-Hop Songs spending fourteen weeks in total on the chart. The song charted at #3 on New Zealands Top 40 chart.

Track listings and formats
US CD Promo
"Only Love" (Radio Edit) - 4:10
"Only Love" (LP Version) - 4:25 

US CD
"Only Love" (LP Version) - 3:56
"So Many Ways" (Remix) (feat. Jay-Z) - 5:37

US Cassette Single
A1 "Only Love" (LP Version)
A2 "So Many Ways" (Remix) (feat. Jay-Z)
B1 "Only Love" (LP Version)
B2 "So Many Ways" (Remix) (feat. Jay-Z)

Chart positions

Weekly charts

Year-end charts

References

1997 singles
American contemporary R&B songs
Songs written by Andrea Martin (musician)